Santiago Nicolás Lizana Lizana (born 30 September 1992) is a Chilean footballer who currently plays for Santiago Morning.

Career

Youth career

Lizana started his career at Primera División de Chile club O'Higgins. He progressed from the under categories club all the way to the senior team.

O'Higgins

In 2012, Lizana was runner-up with O'Higgins, after losing the final against Universidad de Chile in the penalty shoot-out.

Lizana won the Apertura 2013-14 with O'Higgins, in the 2013–14 Súper Final Apertura against Universidad Católica, being the first title for O'Higgins.

In 2014, he won the Supercopa de Chile against Deportes Iquique, in a match that O'Higgins won at the penalty shoot-out.

He participated with the club in the 2014 Copa Libertadores, where they faced Deportivo Cali, Cerro Porteño and Lanús, finishing third and being eliminated in the group stage.

Honours

Club
O'Higgins
Primera División: Apertura 2013-14
Supercopa de Chile: 2014

Palestino
Copa Chile: 2018

Individual

O'Higgins
Medalla Santa Cruz de Triana: 2014

References

External links
 Lizana at Football Lineups
 

1992 births
Living people
Chilean footballers
O'Higgins F.C. footballers
Club Deportivo Palestino footballers
Chilean Primera División players
Association football midfielders
People from Rancagua